The Mussard cave (French: Caverne Mussard) is a mountain cave on the island of Réunion. It is named after the slave hunter , who have killed and captured a lot of Maroons in the mid eighteenth century.

Notes and references 

Caves of Africa
Lava caves
Réunion National Park